Gabilondo may refer to:
 Ángel Gabilondo (born 1949), Spanish politician, brother of Iñaki
 Igor Gabilondo (born 1979), Spanish retired footballer
 Iñaki Gabilondo (born 1942), Spanish journalist and TV news anchor, brother of Ángel
 Ramón Gabilondo (1913–2004), Spanish footballer
 Francisco Gabilondo Soler (1907–1990), Mexican composer and performer of children's songs